The Beijing–Shanghai high-speed train are high-speed train services operated by CR Beijing and CR Shanghai on Beijing–Shanghai HSR in China. The services provide high-speed train connections between Beijing, the capital of China, and Shanghai, the economic center and largest city of the country. Currently, 41 pairs of G-series trains are operated daily.

History

The CRH services between Beijing and Shanghai dates back to the sixth national railway speedup implemented on 18 April 2007, when the D31/32 trains began operation on the Beijing–Shanghai railway. The D32 train had a service time of 9h 59m, which was 2 hours shorter than the Z-series trains, and became the fastest train service between Beijing and Shanghai at that time. One more pair of trains were added to the service on 1 December 2009, under the train numbers D29/30.

On 18 April 2008, one year after the introduction of D-series trains, the Beijing–Shanghai HSR commenced construction. The HSR was inaugurated on 30 June 2011, with the faster G-series trains started operation on it. Some D-series train services were still kept, but were switched to operate on the new HSR. The day-time D-series trains were finally withdrawn from the service on 10 December 2014, with the D316 being upgraded to G412. The night-time D-series sleeper train services remain in operation.

On 26 June 2017, the China Standardized Fuxing EMUs made the debut commercial operation on this service.

Operations

G1-18 and G21/22 are faster services with fewer stops, with an average travelling time of about 4h 30m. G101-160 and G411/412 are services with more intermediate stops, and the travelling time varies from 5h 22m to 6h 24m.

Rolling stocks
CRH380BL and CRH380CL EMUs are the most common trainsets on the service, while some trains are operated by CRH380B, CR400AF and CR400BF EMUs.

CRH380BL

2 types of CRH380BL trains with different formations are operated on the service. The EMUs with numbers CRH380BL-3501～3542 and CRH380BL-5501～5540 have the formation shown below.

CRH380BL EMUs with other numbers have the following formation.

CRH380CL

The prototype trainset (CRH380CL-5601) has a different formation, as is shown below.

CR400AF and CR400BF
Double headed CR400AF and CR400BF EMUs are operated on the service with the formation shown below.

References

China Railway passenger services
Passenger rail transport in China
Railway services introduced in 2011